Superstar is an American television documentary series about the lives of celebrities that shaped American culture. It premiered on ABC on August 11, 2021.

Episodes

Series overview

Season 1 (2021–22)

Season 2 (2022)

Reception

Season 1

Season 2

Notes

References

External links 
 
 

2020s American documentary television series
2021 American television series debuts
American biographical series
American Broadcasting Company original programming
English-language television shows
Historical television series